Nabira Esenbaeva (born 9 December 1998) is an Uzbekistani freestyle wrestler. She won the silver medal in the women's 59 kg event at the 2018 Asian Wrestling Championships held in Bishkek, Kyrgyzstan. In 2019, she won one of the bronze medals in the women's 62 kg event at the Asian Wrestling Championships held in Xi'an, China.

Career 

She competed at the first World Olympic Qualification Tournament held in Ulaanbaatar, Mongolia hoping to qualify for the 2016 Summer Olympics in Rio de Janeiro, Brazil. She was eliminated in her first match. In 2018, she competed in the 57 kg event at the Asian Games held in Jakarta, Indonesia. She won her first match against Mutiara Ayuningtias of Indonesia and she was eliminated from the competition in her next match against Pooja Dhanda of India. At the 2018 World Junior Wrestling Championships held in Trnava, Slovakia, she won the silver medal in the 62 kg event.

In 2019, she competed in the 62 kg event at the World Wrestling Championships held in Nur-Sultan, Kazakhstan. She was eliminated in her first match by Kayla Miracle of the United States. In 2021, she competed at the Asian Olympic Qualification Tournament hoping to qualify for the 2020 Summer Olympics in Tokyo, Japan. She did not qualify at this tournament and she also failed to qualify for the Olympics at the World Olympic Qualification Tournament held in Sofia, Bulgaria.

In 2022, she competed at the Yasar Dogu Tournament held in Istanbul, Turkey.

Major results

References

External links 
 

Living people
1998 births
Place of birth missing (living people)
Uzbekistani female sport wrestlers
Asian Games competitors for Uzbekistan
Wrestlers at the 2018 Asian Games
Asian Wrestling Championships medalists
20th-century Uzbekistani women
21st-century Uzbekistani women